The sulcus limitans is found in the fourth ventricle of the brain. It separates the cranial nerve motor nuclei (medial) from the sensory nuclei (lateral). It can also be located by searching laterally from the medial eminence. It is parallel to the median sulcus.

References

External links
 Diagram of the sulcus limitans
 Sectional Atlas: Pons at the Abducens Nucleus - Facial Colliculus

Brainstem